Şahna  is a village in Erdemli district of Mersin Province, Turkey. The population of the village was 266. as of 2012. According to village dwellers, the original name of the village was Şahane yer ("Wonderful place") referring to beautiful forest scenery around the village. It was founded 200 years ago by Yörüks (then nomadic Turkmen people) from Alanya. A part of the village named Üzümlü recently issued from the village. Main economic activities are farming and animal breeding. Tomato, cucumber, peach, pear and grapes are the major crops.

References

Villages in Erdemli District